The General Assembly of Uruguay or parliament is the legislative branch of the government of Uruguay,  and consists of two chambers: the Chamber of Senators and the Chamber of Representatives. General Assembly has 130 voting members: 99 representatives and 30 senators, the Vice President of the Republic, who serves as President of the General Assembly, and the Senate has the right to vote. The legislature meets in the Legislative Palace in Montevideo. Both senators and representatives are chosen through proportional representation for five-year terms.

The General Assembly holds its sessions in the Chamber of Representatives of the Legislative Palace. During the 19th century, the legislature met in the Montevideo Cabildo.

History 
In 1828, on the initiative of Juan Antonio Lavalleja, delegates were elected to what was to be the Parliament of the Eastern Province of Río de la Plata. As a consequence of the Treaty of Montevideo, such institution became the General Constituent and Legislative Assembly of the State, and had among other tasks the drafting of the country's first Constitution.

The Assembly was unicameral. But since the establishment of the Constitution in 1830, the Uruguayan Parliament became bicameral, and has remained so to this day. The voting system of its members also changed: during the 19th century, voting was reserved for a minority, and senators represented departments. Later, the secret and universal vote was established, and the representativeness of the senators, who are elected at the national level, was reformulated.

Attributes 
The ordinary sessions span is from March 1 to December 15, or until September 15 in the event that elections are held, since the new Assembly must begin its sessions on February 15 of the following year.

Article Ninety of the Uruguayan Constitution requires that members of the Chamber of Representatives must be aged at least 25 and have been a citizen of Uruguay for five years. While Article Ninety-eight requires that the members of the Senate must be at least 30 years old and have been Uruguayan citizens for seven years.

The General Assembly is entitled to politically judge the conduct of the Ministers of State, to declare war and to approve or reject peace treaties, alliances, commerce, and conventions or contracts of any nature that the Executive Power enters into with foreign powers and designate every year the necessary armed force, as well as allowing foreign troops to enter the country. Denying or granting the departure of national forces outside the nation is also among the functions of the Assembly. The creation of new Departments, the setting of their limits, as well as the establishment of customs and export and import duties concern the legislative power, in addition to other functions established in Article Eighty-Five of the Constitution.

Latest elections

Library of the Legislative Power 

The Library of the Legislative Power of Uruguay is a specialized institution whose main objective is to assist Uruguayan legislators and the cultural development of the community in the fulfillment of its functions, in order to provide documentation, information and advice to citizens, thanks to extensive bibliographic, jurisprudential, doctrinal and legislative collection. It is considered the second most important library in Uruguay, behind the National Library, due to the large collection and the status of parliamentary and public library. The current library was founded on August 25, 1929 and has its origin in the unification of the libraries of the Chamber of Representatives and the Chamber of Senators.

Gallery

See also

Chamber of Deputies of Uruguay
Senate of Uruguay
Politics of Uruguay
List of legislatures by country

References

External links
Official website

 
Uruguay
Politics of Uruguay
Uruguay